The women's marathon (T54) at the 2018 Commonwealth Games, as part of the athletics programme, was held in Southport Broadwater Parklands, Gold Coast on 15 April 2018. The event was open to para-sport athletes competing under the T53 / T54 classifications.

Records
Prior to this competition, the existing world record was as follows:

Schedule
The schedule was as follows:

All times are Australian Eastern Standard Time (UTC+10)

Results
The results were as follows:

References

Women's marathon (T54)
2018 in women's athletics